Sheldon Fitts (November 1, 1899 – October 26, 1985) was a college football player. He played as a quarterback and halfback for the Georgia Bulldogs of the University of Georgia, a member of the "ten second backfield" of 1920. Fitts caught the pass to beat Furman and starred in the 56–0 win over Florida. He prepped at Georgia Military College in Milledgeville.

References

External links

1899 births
1985 deaths
American football quarterbacks
Georgia Bulldogs football players
American football halfbacks
Players of American football from Georgia (U.S. state)